Organizations which currently undertake coral reef and atoll restoration projects using simple methods of plant propagation:
 Coral Cay
 Counterpart International
 U.S. Coral Reef Task Force (CRTF)
 National Coral Reef Institute (NCRI)
 US Department of Commerce's National Oceanic and Atmospheric Administration (NOAA): Coral Reef Conservation Program (CRCP)
 National Center for Coral Reef Research (NCORE)
 Reef Ball
 Southeast Florida Coral Reef Initiative (SEFCRI)
Reef Renewal Foundation Bonaire (RRFB)
 Foundation of the peoples of the South Pacific
 WorldFishCenter: promotes sustainable mariculture techniques to grow reef organismsas tridacnidae
 Coral Restoration Foundation (CRF) : Adopt a Coral

Organizations which promote interest, provide knowledge bases about coral reef survival, and promote activities to protect and restore coral reefs:
 Australian Coral Reef Society
 Biosphere Foundation
 Blue Corner Marine Research
 Chagos Conservation Trust
 Conservation Society of Pohnpei
 Conservation Key 
 Coral Cay Conservation
 Coral Reef Care
 Coral Reef Alliance (CORAL) Coral Reef Alliance (CORAL)
 Coral Reef Targeted Research and Capacity Building for Management
 Coral Restoration Foundation
 Coral Triangle Initiative
 Cousteau Society
 Crusoe Reef Society
 CEDAM International
 Earthwatch
 Environmental Defense Fund
 Environmental Solutions International
 Friends of Saba Marine Park
 Global Coral Reef Alliance (GCRA) Global Coral Reef Alliance (GCRA)
 Global Coral Reef Monitoring Network
 Great Barrier Reef Foundation
 Great Barrier Reef Marine Park Authority
 Green Fins
 ICRAN Mesoamerican Reef Alliance
 International Coral Reef Action Network (now defunct ?)
 International Coral Reef Initiative (ICRI)
 International Marinelife Alliance
 International Society for Reef Studies
 Intercoast Network
 Japanese Coral Reef Society
 Kosrae Conservation and Safety Organization
 Marine Conservation Group
 Marine Conservation Society
 Mesoamerican Reef Tourism Initiative (MARTI)
 NSF Moorea Coral Reef Long-term Ecological Research site
 Nature Conservancy
 Ocean Voice International
 Project AWARE
 Planetary Coral Reef Foundation
 Practical Action
 Project Reefkeeper
 ReefBase
 Reef Check
 Reef Relief
 Reefwatch
 Save Our Seas Foundation
 Seacology
 Seamarc Pvt. Ltd.
 SECORE
 Singapore Underwater Federation
 Society for Andaman and Nicobar Ecology
 Tubbataha Foundation
 Wildlife Conservation International
 WWF

See also

 Census of Coral Reefs
Coral reef protection
Frozen zoo
National Ice Core Laboratory
Amphibian Ark
Svalbard Global Seed Vault
Rosetta Project

References

 
Marine conservation organizations